Chromodoris albonotata is a species of colourful sea slug, a dorid nudibranch, a marine gastropod mollusc in the family Chromodorididae.

Distribution
This species was described from Tahiti. It was reported from Hawaii by Bertsch & Johnson (1981) but this was an erroneous identification.

References

Chromodorididae
Gastropods described in 1875